Idlewild is a historic plantation house and historic district just east of Talladega, Alabama, United States.  The property was added to the Alabama Register of Landmarks and Heritage and the National Register of Historic Places in 1993, due to its architectural significance.

History
After settling with his family in Talladega County, just east of the city of Talladega, William Blount McClellan established the plantation of Idlewild and built the house that stands today in 1843. The 1860 United States Census records him as having 46 African slaves.

William B. McClellan was born on January 22, 1798, in Knox County, Tennessee, and died on October 11, 1881, in Talladega County, Alabama.  He married Martha Thompson Roby (b. November 18, 1809, Georgia, d. January 30, 1858, Talladega County, Alabama) on June 30, 1825, and together they had 16 children.  William B. McClellan was a graduate of West Point, a brigadier-general of local Alabama militia, and later a colonel in the Confederate States Army.

References

Houses on the National Register of Historic Places in Alabama
Greek Revival houses in Alabama
Houses completed in 1843
National Register of Historic Places in Talladega County, Alabama
Houses in Talladega County, Alabama
Properties on the Alabama Register of Landmarks and Heritage
Historic districts in Talladega County, Alabama
1843 establishments in Alabama
Historic districts on the National Register of Historic Places in Alabama